The 2007 Bayern Rundfahrt was the 28th edition of the Bayern Rundfahrt cycle race and was held on 30 May to 3 June 2007. The race started in Garmisch-Partenkirchen and finished in Fürth. The race was won by Stefan Schumacher.

General classification

References

Bayern-Rundfahrt
2007 in German sport